Shaheed Dhanani (born 14 February 1987) is a Tanzanian cricketer. He played in the 2016 ICC World Cricket League Division Five tournament. During the tournament, he stood as captain in Tanzania's match against Oman.

References

External links
 

1987 births
Living people
Tanzanian cricketers
Place of birth missing (living people)